There were several independent candidates in the 1985 Ontario provincial election, none of whom were elected.  Information about these candidates may be found on this page.

Paul Schulze (York South)

Schulze was 37 years old, and was a television production assistant for Crossroads Christian Communications Inc.  His campaign was centred on "family values" issues, including opposition to abortion.  He received 1,063 votes (3.51%), finishing fourth against New Democratic Party leader Bob Rae.

Footnotes

1985